Monique diMattina (born 28 December 1971) is an Australian jazz pianist, singer and composer. 

DiMattina is stylistically versatile, composing and performing in a range of genres encompassing jazz roots, country, blues, classical and other contemporary styles. DiMattina's recorded oeuvre reflects these diverse interests and she cites cited J. S. Bach, Nina Simone, Sidney Bechet, Édith Piaf, Bob Dylan, Astor Piazzolla, Toots Thielemans, Rickie Lee Jones, Lili Boulanger, Donny Hathaway and Allen Toussaint as influences on her music. As a songwriter diMattina is known for pithy turns of phrase.

Life and career
DiMattina grew up in Melbourne, Australia. Her paternal grandparents immigrated to Australia from the volcanic island of Stromboli off the coast of Sicily, while she has English (convict) heritage on her mother's side. Both parents and all five siblings played music to some degree. When diMattina's maternal grandmother gifted the household with a piano young Monique became hooked. Through her high school years she focussed on classical piano repertoire, also playing clarinet, alto saxophone, celtic harp, electric bass, guitar and orchestral percussion.

DiMattina studied law at the University of Melbourne after leaving high school, but left the course to take up jazz piano studies at the Victorian College of the Arts. She completed Master of Music and Bachelor of Letters degrees at the University of Melbourne, focussing her masters thesis on Miles Davis pianist Wynton Kelly. In 2000 after receiving several prizes and awards including a Queens Trust award and Fulbright Postgraduate Scholarship, diMattina moved to New York City where she lived on and off until 2009. There she waited tables at the Village Vanguard Jazz Club while studying with Sophia Rosoff, a founder of the Abby Whiteside Foundation, Fred Hersch, Sam Yahel and Barry Harris. She played regularly at the 55 Bar, the Living Room, Rockwood Music Hall and Joe's Pub, performed recitals for dignitaries including Kofi Annan, Bill Clinton and Vaclav Havel. She also worked on the Bjork Dancer in the Dark web orchestrations, opened for Lou Reed, ran the New York City marathon and taught at the Henry Street Music School. In 2002, diMattina released Live at the 55, an instrumental collection of covers and originals in a blues and roots vein, with Adam Armstrong on bass, Kim Thompson on drums, diMattina on wurlitzer piano and K. T Tolhurst on pedal steel. In between periods in New York City, diMattina travelled extensively, spending time in Europe, Japan, China and Sydney as principal pianist in Disney's The Lion King orchestra.

DiMattina's first child was born in Harlem in 2008. She returned to live in Melbourne in 2009.

In 2009 diMattina released her first solo piano album, Senses, on the Move label. In 2010 she released Welcome Stranger on Head Records, the first album in which she sings in addition to playing piano. The album mostly contains original songs, with a cover of Paul Kelly's song "Dumb Things" in a New Orleans style. diMattina has said that the album title refers to a famously large gold nugget unearthed near Ballarat during the Victorian gold rush as well as the experience of returning as a stranger to one's hometown after years away. The album was written of as being quintessentially Melbournesque—"about us and the place we live" by The Age columnist and music writer Chris Johnson. The song "Livingest Place" was described as the "nicest slyest Melbourne vs Sydney song ever" by Doug Spenser on ABC Radio National.

In 2011 diMattina followed with a second solo piano album, Sun Signs, designed around the 12 signs of the zodiac. During this period she performed a regular segment called "Shaken Not Rehearsed" on radio station 3RRR 102.7 FM as a guest on Tim Thorpe's Vital Bits program and later on ABC 774 with Lindy Burns when she would play bespoke songs on air, written according to listener requests within the hour. DiMattina also performed in the Clare Bowditch musical theatre piece Eva based on the life of jazz singer Eva Cassidy and opened for Chris Botti on his Australian tour.

In 2012 diMattina recorded her fifth album, Nola's Ark, at Piety Studios in New Orleans with producer Mark Bingham (John Scofield, Cassandra Wilson) and musicians from the bands of Harry Connick Jr and Dr John including Leroy Jones on trumpet , Matt Perrine on bass and June Yamagishi on guitar. Many of the eight original songs on the album originated in the "Shaken Not Rehearsed" segment. Nola's Ark was released on Head Records in May 2013.

In October 2015 diMattina released Everybody Loves Somebody, her sixth album on the Head Records label. Martin Jones (Rhythms Magazine) wrote "Monique diMattina has reached that hallowed ground where influences and inspirations coalesce to produce a unique voice. On this new album, jazz sensibilities and classic songwriting skills blend to produce something reminiscent of the jazzier shadows of Rickie Lee Jones or Joni Mitchell. That is to say, some of the approaches, and aesthetics draw from jazz, but first and foremost it's about the singer and her songs."
	
In 2016 diMattina was musical director of Tapestry: The Music of Carol King starring Vika Bull and Debra Byrne.
 
From 2017 to the present, diMattina has toured extensively with Australian singer-songwriter Rebecca Barnard in their jointly penned shows The Dao of Dylan and Honky Tonk Women. She has also performed regularly with the Happy House jazz band (Paul Williamson, Fem Belling, Michael Jordan and James Clark), Alma Zygier and Harry James Angus. 

February 2021 is the release date for diMattina's third solo piano album TIDES.  
 
DiMattina lives in Melbourne with her two daughters and teaches at the Victorian College of the Arts (Melbourne Conservatorium of Music) and at the Sir Zelman Cowen School of Music at Monash University.

Discography

Albums
Live @ The 55 (2002) Elwood Records 
Senses (2007) Head Records
Welcome Stranger (2010) Head Records 
Sun Signs (2011) Head Records
Nola's Ark (2013) Head Records
Everybody Loves Somebody (2015) Head Records

Single
 "Say My Name" (2012)

Appearances on other artists' recordings
Clare Bowditch - The Winter I Chose Happiness
Belinda Moody – Moody's Brood
Martha Baartz – Twelve Salutations
Andrew Swann – The Braves
Andrew Swann – Southside Blues
Andrew Swann – Nasty Cook
Andrew Firth – Montage
Tanya Lee Davies - The Duetting Damsel

References

External links
Official website
diMattina on Twitter
diMattina on YouTube
Article in the Sydney Morning Herald
Article on Australian Jazz website
Profile in Inside Story
Recording on Daily Planet

Australian singer-songwriters
Living people
1971 births
21st-century Australian singers
Singers from Melbourne